John Papas is a former American football coach. He was the head football coach at Buckingham Browne & Nichols School, a private school in Cambridge, Massachusetts, from 2003 to 2013. He also was an assistant coach at Harvard University, Bentley University, and Tufts University. He was the first head football coach at Mount Ida College, serving for one season in 1999. He is the founder of the Elite Football Clinics, LLC.

Early life
In his youth, Papas played for the football team, the Red Raiders, at Watertown High School in Watertown, Massachusetts. He played college football at Springfield College in Springfield, Massachusetts, lettering for four years as a tight end. He received Eastern College Athletic Conference weekly honors three times his senior year.

Coaching career

Bentley, Harvard and Tufts
Papas was an assistant coach at Bentley University (1992-1996), Harvard University (1997) and Tufts University (1998, 2000-2002). While at Bentley, Papas was the recruiting coordinator, special teams coordinator and eventually the associate head coach. Those teams had great success, including from 1993-95, when the Falcons won 30 straight, the longest winning streak in the country at that time and the second longest streak by a New England team in the last 100 years. While at Harvard in 1997 as the wide receiver coach, the Crimson won the 1997 Ivy League Title. As the special teams coordinator at Tufts, the Jumbos compiled a 18-14 record, including a 7-1 finish in 1998.

Mount Ida
Papas was the first head football coach at Mount Ida College in Newton, Massachusetts and filled the post for the 1999 season when the team accumulated a record of 3–5. After the first year, long-time head football coach Ed Sweeney took over the program. The first game played by the school was a 36–15 victory over Western New England College played on September 11, 1999.

Buckingham Browne & Nichols
Papas was the head football coach at Buckingham Browne & Nichols School (BB&N), in Cambridge, Massachusetts for 11 seasons, from 2003 to 2013. The BB&N Knights compete in the Independent School League (ISL). Under Papas, the Knights participated in New England prep school bowl games in 2005, 2006, 2008 and 2010, winning New England prep championships in 2005, 2006 and 2008. In 2008, the Knights went undefeated and were the ISL champions. In February 2010, eight BB&N Knights footballers were signed by college football teams, five with NCAA Division I schools. In the fall of 2010, BB&N had 7 alumni playing Ivy League football, the most of any high school in the country.

Papas retired from coaching in 2014.

Honors
In 2018, Papas was elected to the Massachusetts High School Football Coaches Hall of Fame.

Elite Football Clinics
Papas is the founder of the Elite Football Clinic, a training camp for high school players. In June 2019, more than 2500 footballers from 43 states attended Elite clinics at Tufts University, Pomona College, and Christopher Columbus High School. He occasionally comments on football in the media.

The LEAGUE
Papas is the founder and director of The Elite High School Football League, aka The LEAGUE. The LEAGUE was founded in 2021 during the COVID-19 pandemic and has continued to grow throughout New England. It is one of the only independent football leagues in the country and allows high school players to play more football outside of their fall seasons, thus affording them more recruiting opportunities.

References

Year of birth missing (living people)
Living people
Bentley Falcons football coaches
Harvard Crimson football coaches
Mount Ida Mustangs football coaches
Tufts Jumbos football coaches
High school football coaches in Massachusetts
People from Watertown, Massachusetts
Sportspeople from Middlesex County, Massachusetts
Coaches of American football from Massachusetts
Players of American football from Massachusetts